Derek Engler is a former center in the National Football League. He played four seasons with the New York Giants.

References

Players of American football from Saint Paul, Minnesota
New York Giants players
American football centers
Wisconsin Badgers football players
1974 births
Living people